Hedychium flavescens is a perennial flowering plant from the Zingiberaceae (the ginger family). It is native to the Himalayas, Sichuan, and northern Vietnam, and naturalized in various other lands (South Africa, Madagascar, Mauritius, India, Sri Lanka, French Polynesia, Hawaii, etc.).

It is extremely shade-tolerant, and thrives in a wide range of soils. Since it has the ability to regrow from even a small fragment of the rhizome, which survive crushing, immersion in sea water, and even years outside of soil, elimination can be a problem. It is treated as an invasive weed in New Zealand because of its ability to displace other species.

References

Flora of China
Flora of Assam (region)
Flora of East Himalaya
Flora of Nepal
Flora of Vietnam
Plants described in 1824
flavescens